Ronnie & The Hi-Lites were an American doo-wop musical group, formed in Jersey City, New Jersey, United States, in the early 1960s. 

On March 31, 1962, their song "I Wish That We Were Married", a slow ballad sung from the point of view of a young boy expressing his wishes that he and his sweetheart would stay together, charted and rose to number 16 on the Billboard Hot 100 chart, spending twelve weeks on the chart. Selling over half a million copies, the song put 14-year-old Ronnie Goodson and company on the map, paving the way for performances alongside Stevie Wonder, Major Lance and Ronnie's girlfriend Eva Boyd, better known as Little Eva.  They subsequently appeared on American Bandstand, at The Apollo and numerous venues throughout the east coast. "I Wish That We Were Married" is perhaps known for Ronnie's emotional sobbing, adding to the theme of the song.

The group was originally called the Cascades, not to be confused with a different group of the same name that recorded "Rhythm of the Rain". Initially consisting of tenors Sonny Caldwell and John Whitney, bass singer Kenny Overby and baritone Stanley Brown, the group added 12-year-old Ronnie Goodson as their lead singer. They were soon introduced to songwriter/producer team Marion and Hal Weiss, who offered them "I Wish That We Were Married".

The small independent record label, Joy Records, picked up the group's recording and renamed the ensemble Ronnie & the Hi-Lites.  They subsequently released the single and the group went on to record fifteen more singles without troubling the chart compilers again.     

Ronnie Goodson died in his sleep, from a brain tumor, at the age of 33 on November 4, 1980.

References

External links
 Billboard Chart Position
 American Singing Groups-A history from 1940 to today. Page 443 to 444
 Ronnie & the Hi-Lites picture
 Ronnie & the Hi-Lites at AllMusic
 Ronnie Goodson in Rock Obituaries by Nick Talevski

Doo-wop groups
musicians from Jersey City, New Jersey
Musical groups from New Jersey